Diego Armando Díaz Ahumada (born 12 June 1986), nicknamed Pescadito (Little Fish), is a Chilean former professional footballer.

Career
In January 2021, he announced his retirement from playing football at professional level due to a knee injury.

Honours
Universidad de Concepción
 Copa Chile (2): 2008–09, 2014–15
 Primera B (1): 2013 Transición

References

External links
 
 
 Diego Díaz at playmakerstats.com (English version of ceroacero.es)

1986 births
Living people
People from Curicó
Chilean footballers
Curicó Unido footballers
Universidad de Concepción footballers
Deportes Temuco footballers
Deportes Santa Cruz footballers
Deportes Recoleta footballers
Chilean Primera División players
Primera B de Chile players
Segunda División Profesional de Chile players
Association football defenders